Mammal  is a 2016 internationally co-produced drama film directed by Rebecca Daly. It was shown in the World Cinema Dramatic Competition section at the 2016 Sundance Film Festival.

Cast
 Rachel Griffiths as Margaret
 Michael McElhatton as Matt
 Barry Keoghan as Joe
 Danika McGuigan as Ann Marie
 Johnny Ward as Sully
 Joanne Crawford as Jean Cunningham

References

External links
 

2016 films
2016 drama films
Irish drama films
Dutch drama films
Luxembourgian drama films
English-language Dutch films
English-language Irish films
English-language Luxembourgian films
Films set in Ireland 
2010s English-language films